"14 Years" is a song by the American rock band Guns N' Roses, released in 1991 on their album Use Your Illusion II.

Background
The song is one of the few Guns N' Roses tunes sung almost entirely by Izzy Stradlin with Axl Rose singing the chorus.

"14 Years" was only performed live when Stradlin was still in the band. It has been speculated to be about Rose's and Stradlin's friendship, with people pointing out that they had known each other for 14 years by the time the song was supposedly written.  This has never been confirmed by the band.

An earlier demo had different lyrics with the first verse and the chorus slightly modified, while the second and third verses were given a complete makeover. Parts of the demo's second verse would be used in the third verse of the final version, while the third verse is a slightly modified version of the demo's first verse. Stradlin would sometimes change the lyrics a bit when singing the song live. 

The song was part of the set list at a few live concerts in 2012 featuring Izzy Stradlin.

Personnel
 W. Axl Rose – backing vocals, piano
 Slash – lead guitar
 Izzy Stradlin – rhythm guitar, lead vocals
 Duff McKagan – bass, backing vocals
 Matt Sorum – drums
 Dizzy Reed – organ, (in the video, he's playing the piano)

References

Guns N' Roses songs
1991 songs
Songs written by Axl Rose
Songs written by Izzy Stradlin
Blues rock songs